Epigeus is the largest known impact crater on Jupiter's Galilean satellite Ganymede, with a diameter of 343 km. It is 6.5% the mean equatorial diameter of Ganymede, .

At the center of Epigeus, there is a 25-km-radius region of sub-radial dark-floored troughs or fractures. These troughs range from approximately 150 to 250 m across, are generally linear, and merge in dendritic or anastomosing patterns. The troughs exhibit two orthogonal preferred orientations, trending north–south and east–west. A bright, rough-textured, lobate deposit occupies the central 15 to 20 km of this region and locally surrounds troughs up to 25 km from the palimpsest center. This bright region consists of massifs 200 to 300 m across separated by 200 to 300 m. The outer ring is a complex zone corresponding to a crater diameter. The zone between those two rings is relatively smooth and it is covered in small knobs. Several lobes of this unit appear to have flowed into Valleys within this outer ring zone. The smooth units in the center and between the inner and outer rings may be a solidified impact-melt sheet. Epigeus' basin is rich with ice deposits.

Epigeus was named after the Phoenician god; this name was approved by the International Astronomical Union in 1997.

References 

Impact craters on Ganymede (moon)